Charles Drinkwater may refer to:
 Charles Graham Drinkwater (1875–1946), Canadian ice hockey player, businessman and philanthropist
 Charles Drinkwater (soccer), American soccer outside left